Set It Right may refer to:

"Set It Right", song by The Colourist from Will You Wait for Me (EP) 
"Set It Right", song by Hungry Kids of Hungary from Escapades (Hungry Kids of Hungary album) Hungry Kids of Hungary (EP)
"Set It Right", song by American musician How to Dress Well.  Total Loss (album)
"To Set It Right" with Nichelle Nichols 1964 episode of The Lieutenant TV series